Mark Rivera (born May 24, 1953) is an American saxophonist, multi-instrumentalist, singer, musical director and corporate entertainment provider who is mostly known for his work with Billy Joel. In addition to playing soprano, alto, tenor and baritone saxophones, Rivera's musical abilities encompass vocals, guitar, bass, flute, percussion, hammer and chromium steel pipe, and keyboards.

Early life
Mark Rivera was born in Brooklyn, New York, and attended the High School of Performing Arts in Manhattan. His mother is American and his father is a Puerto Rican American.

Career
Rivera's first national exposure came with the band Tycoon in the mid 1970s. From this venture he met the legendary producer Robert John "Mutt" Lange. Lange, as part of an association with Mick Jones and Lou Gramm of Foreigner, introduced Rivera to the "big leagues" of rock music, recording and performing.

Over the years, Rivera has worked with Hall & Oates, Tycoon, Peter Gabriel on his groundbreaking So album – where Rivera played on "Sledgehammer" and "Big Time", Simon & Garfunkel, John Lennon, Billy Ocean, and Eagles guitarist Joe Walsh.

Rivera has played with Billy Joel and his band since 1982, replacing Richie Cannata.

In 1995, Rivera joined Ringo Starr & His All-Starr Band, with which he would continue for several tours.

In 2014, Rivera released his first solo album, Common Bond, which includes appearances by Joel, Starr, Nils Lofgren and Steve Lukather. The song "Money Money Money" was a finalist for 2014's Coolest Song in the World on Little Steven's Underground Garage.

Musical director
Rivera's work as a musical director has gained recognition from his association with Ringo Starr & His All-Starr Band, Billy Joel and Elton John. In 2007, he was the Musical Director for  "Dear Mr. Fantasy: A Celebration for Jim Capaldi" along with Steve Winwood, Joe Walsh, Paul Weller, Pete Townshend and Jon Lord. He has also developed a growing career in promoting and producing corporate entertainment and related events. His company, The Mark Rivera Entertainment Group, has produced events for HBO, IBM, Merrill Lynch, AT&T, Coldwell Banker, Northwest Airlines and numerous trade associations, charitable events, and local/national educational groups.

Endorsements
Rivera's professional endorsements include Yamaha Saxophones, Fender, AMT Microphones, Eventide, and Korg USA.

See also
Billy Joel Band

References

External links

Living people
Musicians from Brooklyn
Singers from New York (state)
American male saxophonists
American rock saxophonists
1952 births
American rock percussionists
American flautists
American rock keyboardists
American rock guitarists
American male guitarists
American multi-instrumentalists
American male singers
Guitarists from New York (state)
American people of Puerto Rican descent
20th-century American guitarists
21st-century American saxophonists
21st-century American keyboardists
20th-century American keyboardists
Billy Joel Band members
Ringo Starr & His All-Starr Band members
20th-century flautists
21st-century flautists